The preliminaries and repechages of the Men's 67kg competition at the 2018 World Karate Championships were held on November 7th, 2018 and the finals on November 10th, 2018.

Results

Finals

Repechage
Preliminary repechage fight

Pool A
Preliminary round fights

Pool B
Preliminary round fights

Pool C
Preliminary round fights

Pool D
Preliminary round fights

References

External links
Draw

Men's 67kg